The 2022 ATP Finals (also known as the 2022 Nitto ATP Finals for sponsorship reasons) is a men's tennis tournament played on indoor hard courts at the Pala Alpitour in Turin, Italy, from 13 to 20 November 2022. It is the season-ending event for the highest-ranked singles players and doubles teams on the 2022 ATP Tour.

This is the 53rd edition of the tournament (48th in doubles), and the second time Turin hosted the ATP Tour year-end championships.

Champions

Singles 

  Novak Djokovic def.  Casper Ruud, 7–5, 6–3

Doubles 

  Rajeev Ram /  Joe Salisbury def.  Nikola Mektić /  Mate Pavić, 7–6(7–4), 6–4

Points and prize money 
The ATP Finals currently (2022) rewards the following points and prize money, per victory:

 An undefeated champion would earn the maximum 1,500 points, and $4,740,300 in singles or $930,300 in doubles.

Format 
The ATP Finals group stage has a round-robin format, with eight players/teams divided into two groups of four and each player/team in a group playing the other three in the group. The eight seeds were determined by the Pepperstone ATP rankings and ATP Doubles Team Rankings on the Monday after the last ATP Tour tournament of the calendar year. All singles matches, including the final, were best of three sets with tie-breaks in each set including the third. All doubles matches were two sets (no ad) and a Match Tie-break.

In deciding placement within a group, the following criteria were used, in order:

 Most wins.
 Most matches played (e.g., a 2–1 record beats a 2–0 record).
 Head-to-head result between tied players/teams.
 Highest percentage of sets won.
 Highest percentage of games won.
 ATP rank after the last ATP Tour tournament of the year.

Criteria 4–6 were used only in the event of a three-way tie; if one of these criteria decided a winner or loser among the three, the remaining two would have been ranked by head-to-head result.

The top two of each group advanced to semifinals, with the winner of each group playing the runner-up of the other group. The winners of the semifinals then played for the title.

Qualification

Singles 
Eight players compete at the tournament, with two named alternates. Players receive places in the following order of precedence:
 First, the top 7 players in the ATP Race to Turin on the Monday after the final tournament of the ATP Tour. In 2022, the final tournament was Paris Masters.
 Second, up to two 2022 Grand Slam tournament winners ranked anywhere 8th–20th, in ranking order
 Third, the eighth ranked player in the ATP rankings
In the event of this totaling more than 8 players, those lower down in the selection order become the alternates. If further alternates are needed, these players are selected by the ATP.

Provisional rankings are published weekly as the ATP Race to Turin, coinciding with the 52-week rolling ATP rankings on the date of selection. Points are accumulated in Grand Slam, ATP Tour, ATP Cup, ATP Challenger Tour and ITF Tour tournaments. Players accrue points across 19 tournaments, usually made up of:
 The 4 Grand Slam tournaments
 The 8 mandatory ATP Masters 1000 tournaments
 The best results from any 7 other tournaments that carry ranking points (ATP Cup, Monte-Carlo Masters, ATP 500, ATP 250, Challenger, ITF)

Doubles 
Eight teams compete at the tournament, with one named alternate. The eight competing teams receive places according to the same order of precedence as in singles. The named alternate will be offered first to any unaccepted teams in the selection order, then to the highest ranked unaccepted team, and then to a team selected by the ATP. Points are accumulated in the same competitions as for the singles tournament. However, for Doubles teams there are no commitment tournaments, so teams are ranked according to their 19 highest points scoring results from any tournaments on the ATP Tour.

Qualified players

Singles

Doubles

Groupings

Singles 
The singles draw of the 2022 edition of the Year–end Championships will feature three number ones, three major champions and two major finalists. The competitors were divided into two groups.

Doubles 
The doubles draw of the 2022 edition of the Year–end Championships will feature six major champions, six number ones and 1 major finalist team. The pairs were divided into two groups.

Points breakdown

Singles 

Notes

Doubles 

Notes

Head-to-head records 
Below are the head-to-head records as they approached the tournament.

Singles

Doubles

See also 
 ATP rankings
 2022 ATP Tour
 2022 WTA Finals
 ATP Finals appearances

References

External links 
  
 ATP tournament profile

 
Finals
2022
2022 ATP Finals
Sports competitions in Turin
ATP Finals
ATP Finals